Comedy Central is a Latin American pay television channel, owned by Paramount Networks Americas. It was launched on 1 February 2012.

History

Programming
In Latin America, Comedy Central has three different programming schedules for each of its three feeds:

Northern feed

Cartoons
 South Park
 Happy Tree Friends
 Drawn Together
 Ugly Americans
 Jeff & Some Aliens
 Daria
 The Ren & Stimpy Show
 La familia del barrio (es)

Original series
 Alternatino with Arturo Castro

Local productions
 La culpa es de Llorente
 Stand-up shows by Colombian comedians
 Stand-up shows by Mexican comedians

Sitcoms
 La familia P. Luche
 My Wife and Kids
 Everybody Hates Chris
 The Fresh Prince of Bel-Air
 Yo soy Betty, la fea
 The Neighborhood
 Kenan & Kel

Series
 Orange Is the New Black
 Mi corazón es tuyo

Specials
 Comedy films in the afternoon and the evening

Anime
 One-Punch Man

Southern feed

Cartoons
 South Park
 Drawn Together
 The Ren & Stimpy Show
 Sanjay and Craig
 Daria
 Pig Goat Banana Cricket
 Ugly Americans

Original series
 Alternatino with Arturo Castro

Local productions
 Stand-up shows by Argentine comedians

Productions with comments
 Idiotas por accidente (comments by Diego Korol)
 Takeshi's Castle Thailand (comments by Osvaldo Príncipi)

Sitcoms
 The Office
 Schitt's Creek
 Teachers
 My Wife and Kids
 Everybody Hates Chris
 The Fresh Prince of Bel-Air
 The Goldbergs
 Casados con hijos

Sketches
 Lip Sync Battle
 Key & Peele
 Bad Robots
 Backdoor - Humor por donde no lo esperas

Series
 Orange Is the New Black

Specials
 Comedy Central Roast
 Comedy films in the afternoon

Brazil

Cartoons
 South Park
 Drawn Together
 Ugly Americans
 Jeff & Some Aliens
 Animatoons

Original series
 Broad City
 Alternatino with Arturo Castro

Local productions
 A Culpa é do Cabral
 A Culpa é do Cabral na Estrada
 Pipocando: O Dobro de Manteiga
 Stand-up shows by Brazilian comedians

Productions with local comments
 Takeshi's Castle Thailand  (comments by Caito Mainier)
 Idiotando  (comments by Wendel Bezerra)

Sitcoms
 Teachers
 My Wife and Kids
 Everybody Hates Chris
 The Fresh Prince of Bel-Air
 Are We There Yet?
 The Goldbergs
 The Neighborhood

Sketches
 Lip Sync Battle
 Bad Robots
 Porta no Comedy
 Porta no Comedy XXL

Late-night talk show
 The Noite com Danilo Gentili

Anime
 One-Punch Man

References

External links 
 ComedyCentral.la
 ComedyCentral Brazil

Comedy Central
Spanish-language television stations
Television channels and stations established in 2012